Khall is an administrative subdivision (Tehsil) of Lower Dir District in the Khyber Pakhtunkhwa province of Pakistan. It is named after Khal (Bindi), a decorative dot worn on the centre of the forehead, as it is located in the centre of Dir. It is listed among:

 Adenzai Tehsil
 Balambat Tehsil
 Khall Tehsil
 Lal Qilla Tehsil
 Munda Tehsil
 Samar Bagh Tehsil
 Timergara Tehsil

Lower Dir District Tehsils have 37 Union Councils. The population is 797,852 according to the 1998 census report. The projected population of Dir Lower was 1,037,091 in 2005 with the same growth between the 1981 and 1998 census i.e. 3.42% per annum.

See also 

 Lower Dir District

External links
Khyber-Pakhtunkhwa Government website section on Lower Dir
United Nations

Lower Dir District
Tehsils of Khyber Pakhtunkhwa
Tehsils of Lower Dir District
Populated places in Lower Dir District